JIA or Jia may refer to

JIA
 Japan Institute of Architects
 Juína Airport IATA code
 Jacksonville International Airport, a medium-to-large airport in the U.S. city of Jacksonville, Florida
 Jetstream International Airlines, now known as PSA Airlines
 Johannesburg International Airport, a large airport near the city of Johannesburg in South Africa
 Journal of the Institute of Actuaries, the former name of a peer-reviewed journal published by the Institute of Actuaries
 Juvenile idiopathic arthritis, a disease of joints in young people

Jia
 Jia (EP), by Jia, 2017
 Jia (vessel), a type of ancient Chinese bronze or pottery vessel
 Family (Ba Jin novel) (家, pinyin: Jiā), a 1931–1932 novel by Ba Jin
 Jia (甲, Kah), a unit of land measurement used in Taiwan, equal to 0.9699 hectares

Places
 Jia County, Henan (郏县), of Pingdingshan, Henan, China
 Jia County, Shaanxi (佳县), of Yulin, Shaanxi, China
 Jia, Guan County (贾镇), a town in Guan County, Shandong, China
 Jia, Iran, a village in Zanjan Province, Iran

People
 Jia (name) a Chinese name
 Jia (surname), a Chinese surname
 Jia (singer) (born 1990), Chinese singer, former member of South Korean girl group Miss A
 Jia Tolentino, American staff writer for The New Yorker

See also
 Jiah Khan (1988–2013), Indian film actress